Paul Brothers (born April 18, 1945) is a former American football quarterback in the Canadian Football League for the BC Lions and Ottawa Rough Riders. He was drafted by the Dallas Cowboys in the sixteenth round of the 1967 NFL Draft. He played college football at Oregon State University.

Early years
Brothers was a two-time All-State quarterback at Roseburg High School, where he led the team to a football state championship in 1961. Following graduation in 1963, he stayed in state to play at Oregon State University in Corvallis.

College career
Brothers accepted a football scholarship from Oregon State University to play under head coach Tommy Prothro. As a sophomore, he was named the starter at quarterback after a season opener loss against Northwestern University. He would lead the Beavers to 8 wins out of the next 9 games, the Pac-8 title and the Rose Bowl, where they lost 34-7 to the Michigan Wolverines. 

In his senior season in 1966, under second-year head coach Dee Andros, injuries forced him to split time with sophomore Steve Preece.

Brothers finished his career as a three-year starter, recording 184 completions out of 404 attempts	(45.5 avg.), 2,151 passing yards, 15 touchdowns, 17 interceptions, 376 carries for 1,090 yards (2.9-yard avg.) and 13 rushing touchdowns. At the time, he ranked second in school history behind Terry Baker in total offense.

In 1997, he was inducted into the Oregon State University Athletics Hall of Fame. In 2010, he was inducted into the Oregon Sports Hall of Fame.

Professional career
Brothers was selected by the Dallas Cowboys in the 16th round (416th overall) of the 1967 NFL draft, but opted not to sign with the team.

On March 15, 1967, he was signed by the BC Lions of the Canadian Football League, who already had veteran quarterback Joe Kapp, but did not know if he would re-sign. In July, he was waived after the Lions had previously acquired Bernie Faloney to be their starting quarterback. On August 5, Brothers was sent to the Eugene Bombers of the Continental Football League to gain more experience.

In 1968, he was one of the three starters at quarterback that the Lions used during the season. In 1969 he was named the starter, registering 200 completions (tied for third in club history) out of 406 attempts, 2,671 passing yards, 14 touchdowns and 33 interceptions. 

In 1970, he posted 2,604 passing yards, 14 touchdowns and 19 interceptions. On September 8, 1971, he was released after starting 7 games with a 3-4 record. He started 48 games during his tenure with the Lions.

On September 14, 1971, he began a five game trial with the Ottawa Rough Riders, eventually earning a permanent role. On June 17, 1973, he announced his retirement to focus on his real estate business in Oregon.

Coaching career
Brothers coached football and girls basketball at Marist High School in Eugene, Oregon from 1975 to 1986 with a record of 196-139. He joined the Willamette High School girls basketball program before the 1993-94 season, where he had a coaching record of 437-122, 17 consecutive postseason appearances, and won four Class 5A state championships (2007, 2009, 2013 and 2014). He retired in 2014.

References

External links
Just Sports Stats
College stats

Living people
1945 births
Sportspeople from Roseburg, Oregon
Players of American football from Oregon
American football quarterbacks
Canadian football quarterbacks
American players of Canadian football
Oregon State Beavers football players
Continental Football League players
BC Lions players
Ottawa Rough Riders players
High school football coaches in Oregon
High school basketball coaches in Oregon
American women's basketball coaches